The 1954 Bolivian Primera División, the first division of Bolivian football (soccer), was played by 9 teams. The champion was Litoral.

Torneo Integrado

Standings

External links
 Official website of the LFPB 

Bolivian Primera División seasons
Bolivia
1954 in Bolivian sport